Yenakiyeve Iron and Steel Works Public Joint Stock Company (PJSC) “Yenakiyeve Iron and Steel Works” (ticker EMZ) is an integrated steelmaking enterprise comprising OJSC "Yenakiyeve Iron and Steel Works" and JV "Metalen" LLC. Yenakiyeve Iron and Steel Works (Yenakiyeve Steel) is a major employer of Yenakiieve town (Donetsk Oblast) with the population of 140 thousand people. The Works is located in the vicinity of the railway station “Yenakiyeve” and in 60 km from Donetsk.

A trade blockade by Ukrainian activists during the War in Donbass has all but halted production in February 2017. On 1 March 2017 the separatist Donetsk People's Republic nationalized (along with all Ukrainian enterprises located in territory it controlled) the company. The Commercial Court of Donetsk Oblast declared the enterprise bankrupt in July 2019.

History

The enterprise has more than hundred year working experience.

November 1897 - the first blast furnace was blown and first cast iron produced. This date is considered to be the date when Petrovskiy (Yenakiievskiy) steel works was established. Another blast furnace, Bessemer and rail rolling shops were introduced in December.

1898  - a year after the steel works was established the place of its location and the nearest mining plants and settlements was called Yenakiyeve after the name of engineer Fedor Yenakiev.

By 1914 6 blast furnaces and 7 open-hearth furnace, 2 converters, 8 rolling mills had been working at the steel works.

In 1931 first domestic casting machine was introduced.

1938 - first sintering plant is launched

1968 - The Steel works received Order of the Red Banner of Labour.

Production

Key types of products producing at Yenakiyeve Steel:

 hot metal and pig iron;
 steel in ingots;
 concast square billets;
 shapes and rolled section

Yenakiyeve Iron and Steel Works is one of the world’s leading square billet producers.
Yenakiyeve Steel is a part of Metinvest Group Steel and Rolled Products Division.

See also
 FC Pivdenstal Yenakiieve

References

External links 
 EMZ official website

Metinvest
Steel companies of Ukraine
Economy of Donetsk Oblast
Steel companies of the Ukrainian Soviet Socialist Republic
1895 establishments in Ukraine